The bog dwarf salamander (Eurycea sphagnicola) is a species of salamander endemic to the southern United States.

Taxonomy 
It was previously thought to be a population of the southeastern dwarf salamander (E. quadridigitata) but a 2017 study found it to be a distinct species based on genetic evidence, and described it as E. sphagnicola. It is unlikely that any previous studies had analyzed populations of this species. 

It is the most divergent of the eastern species in the dwarf salamander complex, having diverged from the clade containing E. quadridigitata, E. hillisi, and E. chamberlaini during the late Oligocene to mid-Miocene, about 23-15 million years ago.

Distribution 
It is found only in a small portion of the Gulf Coast of the United States, being found in the western Florida Panhandle and southern Alabama and Mississippi. It is likely the most geographically restricted of all species in the dwarf salamander complex.

Habitat 
It is notable for its breeding habitats being restricted to mats of Sphagnum moss on acidic hillside seepage bogs. It breeds in sluggish but flowing water.

References 

Sphagnicola
Endemic fauna of the United States
Amphibians of the United States
Amphibians described in 2017